Certificates of Death is a 1923 German silent film directed by Lothar Mendes and starring Alfred Abel, Eva May, and Iván Petrovich.

The film's sets were designed by the art director Stefan Lhotka.

Cast

References

Bibliography

External links

1923 films
Films of the Weimar Republic
Films directed by Lothar Mendes
German silent feature films
German black-and-white films
UFA GmbH films